Jason Chan may refer to:

 Jason Keng-Kwin Chan (born 1971), Malaysian actor
 Jason Chan Chi-san (born 1977), Hong Kong actor and television presenter
 Jason Chan (singer) (born 1983), Hong Kong singer
 Jason Chan (rugby league) (born 1984), rugby league player
 Jason Chan (figure skater) (born 1996), Canadian-Australian ice dancer
 Amaz (video game player) (born 1991), Hong Kong-born Canadian-American video game player Jason Chan

See also
 Jason Chen (disambiguation)